The brown-throated barbet (Psilopogon corvinus) is a species of bird in the family Megalaimidae.
It is endemic to western Java.

Its natural habitats are subtropical or tropical moist lowland forests and subtropical or tropical moist montane forests.

References

brown-throated barbet
Birds of Java
brown-throated barbet
Taxonomy articles created by Polbot